Nikos Aliagas (Nikólaos "Níkos" Aliágas; born 13 May 1969) is a Greek-French journalist and entertainer, known for being the host of the French reality program Star Academy.

Biography
Both of his parents, Andreas and Harula Aliagas are Greek. His father comes from the area of Stamna in Aetolia-Acarnania while his mother comes from Messolonghi, located in the same regional unit in Greece. He lived between France and Greece during his childhood.

He was a guest star on a Greek program Koita ti Ekanes in late-2003 and featured clips from Star Academy. He has published a book called "I was born Greek: The mythology or The school of life". He was the presenter of a show on Alpha TV called "Gros Plan" where he met international stars like Celine Dion, Jean Paul Gaultier, Sylvester Stallone and Helena Paparizou.
He is the French presenter of The Voice: la plus belle voix.

He is multilingual, being able to speak five languages.

Discography

References

External links

Olivier Minne, Nikos Aliagas et Anne-Gaëlle Riccio se défoulent sur TF6 (Olivier Minne, Nikos Aliagas and Anne-Gaëlle Riccio unwind on TF6) 
Nikos Aliagas 
Nikos Aliagas 

1969 births
Living people
Journalists from Paris
Mass media people from Paris
Greek entertainers
French television presenters
Greek television presenters
French radio presenters
Greek radio presenters
French people of Greek descent